The 1971 NCAA University Division Golf Championship was the 33rd annual NCAA-sanctioned golf tournament to determine the individual and team national champions of men's collegiate golf in the United States.

The tournament was held at the Tucson National Golf Club in Tucson, Arizona.

Texas won the team title, the Longhorns' first NCAA team national title.

Individual results

Individual champion
 Ben Crenshaw, Texas

Team results

Note: Top 10 only
DC = Defending champions
First time qualifiers: Long Beach State

References

NCAA Men's Golf Championship
Golf in Arizona
NCAA Golf Championship
NCAA Golf Championship
NCAA Golf Championship